Simcha is Hebrew for happiness or joy.

Simcha may also refer to:
A joyous event in Judaism, such as a wedding, bar mitzvah, or bat mitzvah is generally referred to as a simcha

Simcha may also refer to:

People
Reza Simkhah (born 1970), Iranian wrestler
Simcha Barbiro (born 1967), Israeli actor
Simcha Blass (1897–1982), Polish-Israeli engineer and inventor
Simcha Bunim Alter (1898–1992)
Simcha Bunim Cohen, Orthodox rabbi and author
Simcha Bunim of Peshischa (1765–1827), key leader of Hasidic Judaism in Poland
Simcha Dinitz (1929–2003), Israeli statesman and politician
Simcha Eichenstein (born 1983), American politician
Simcha Elberg (1915–1995), Talmudic scholar
Simcha Felder, American politician
Simcha Friedman (1911–1990), Israeli rabbi, educator, and politician
Simcha Holtzberg (1924–1994), Israeli activist and Holocaust survivor
Simcha Jacobovici (born 1953), "Naked Archaeologist"
Simcha Krauss (born 1937), rabbi
Simcha Leiner (born 1989), American singer
Simcha Lieberman (1929–2009), Israeli Talmudic scholar
Simcha of Rome, a Jewish scholar and rabbi
Simcha Rotem (1924–2018), Polish-Israeli veteran
Simcha Shirman (born 1947), German born Israeli photographer
Simcha Soroker (1928–2004), Israeli economist
Simcha Weinstein (born 1975), English author and a rabbi
Simcha Zelig Reguer (1864–1942), chief Rabbinical judge
Simcha Zissel Halevi Levovitz (1908–2001), rabbi
Simcha Zissel Ziv (1824–1898), early leader of the Musar movement
Simcha Zorin (1902–1974), Jewish Soviet partisan commander in Minsk
Simchah Roth (died 2012), Israeli rabbi and scholar

See also
Simchat Torah
Happiness in Judaism